Bapi or BAPI may refer to:


People
Bapi Debnath, Professional Graphic Designer Of Bangladesh
Bapi Das Baul, Baul performer of Bengali mystical folk music
Bapi Bose (1909–1977), Indian cricketer
Bapi Saha (born 1991), Indian footballer
Bapi–Tutul, one member of the Hindi film singer-songwriter duo

BAPI
Business Application Programming Interface, used to connect SAP
Punta Indio Naval Air Base Argentine Navy identifier (Spanish: Base Aeronaval Punta Indio)
BAPI (bomb) - see List of modern weapons of the Brazilian Air Force

Other uses
"Bapi", nickname for bapineuzumab, an antibody

See also
Bappi Lahiri, Indian music composer, music director, singer, actor and record producer
Bappy Chowdhury, Bangladeshi film actor